Erik Duvander (born 23 February 1962) is a Swedish equestrian. He competed in the individual eventing at the 1992 Summer Olympics.

References

External links
 

1962 births
Living people
American male equestrians
Swedish male equestrians
Olympic equestrians of Sweden
Equestrians at the 1992 Summer Olympics
Sportspeople from Chicago